Petr Ignatenko (born 27 September 1987) is a Russian professional road racing cyclist.

Doping
In June 2015, Petr Ignatenko tested positive for human growth hormone (hGH) in an out-of-competition test on 8 April 2015. This is only the second hGH positive since Patrick Sinkewitz returned an adverse analytical finding for the substance. This represented RusVelo's fifth positive in less than two years, Ignatenko was subsequently fired by the team.

Palmarès

2008
2nd Overall Way to Peking
2010
1st Overall Giro della Valle d'Aosta
1st Stage 3
1st Stage 7 Tour of Bulgaria
2012
Tour de Romandie
1st  Sprints classification
1st  Mountains classification
 9th Overall Tour of Austria
2013
 6th Overall Tour of Austria
2014
 5th Overall Tour de Langkawi

Grand Tour general classification results timeline

See also
List of doping cases in cycling

References

External links

1987 births
Living people
Russian male cyclists
Sportspeople from Omsk